The 2022 FIA Motorsport Games GT Sprint Cup is the first FIA Motorsport Games GT Sprint Cup, held at Circuit Paul Ricard, France on 26 October to 30 October 2022. The race was contested with GT3-spec cars. Platinum to Silver drivers will be allowed to compete. The event was part of the 2022 FIA Motorsport Games.

Entry list

References

External links

GT Sprint